The Tuichawng is a river of Mizoram, Northeast India. It is a tributary of Karnaphuli river.

Geography

References

Rivers of Mizoram
Rivers of India